The Caproni Ca.603 was an aerobatic training aircraft built in Italy by Caproni in the early 1940s.

Design
The Ca.603 was derived from the training two-seater Ca.602 but differed in having a smaller wing surface and a more reinforced structure, with sturdy interconnecting uprights between the upper and lower wings. The aircraft had the fuselage in steel tubes welded and covered up to the passenger compartment, by duralumin panels; the remaining part of the fuselage was in canvas. The wings were of the same opening, based on a wooden two- sided beam; the leading edge and the end were covered with plywood, while the rest of the wing was covered in canvas. The wings were connected to each other by tubular steel uprights stanched and braced by tie rods; the fairing cart was fixed, with independent wheels, with the swiveling rear wheel and open steering position. The full tail was redesigned and decidedly wider.

Development
In tests conducted between November and December 1940 the acrobatic performances were judged excellent, except in the figure of the screw probably due to the excessive size of the tail plans. However it was judged as the best acrobatic airplane in existence; however, they proposed changes concerning the change of the wing profile with the progress of the passenger compartment, and also possibly the modification of the vertical embedment both in length and in the design.

The only example in May 1942 was transferred to the Rome-Centocelle airport; after 1943 the traces of the aircraft were lost.

Variants
Ca.602two-seat trainer
Ca.603single-seat aerobatic version of the Ca.602

Specifications (Ca.603)

References

Ca.603
Aerobatic aircraft
Single-engined tractor aircraft
Aircraft first flown in 1940
Biplanes